The Union-Rennen is a Group 2 flat horse race in Germany open to three-year-old thoroughbreds. It is run at Cologne over a distance of 2,200 metres (about 1 mile and 3 furlongs), and it is scheduled to take place each year in June.

History
The event was established in 1834, and it was originally held at Tempelhof on the site of what became Berlin Tempelhof Airport. It was initially contested over 2,400 metres, and it was extended to 2,800 metres in 1837.

The race was transferred to Hoppegarten in 1868, and it was cut to 2,200 metres in 1888. It was staged at Grunewald for a short period after World War I, and it returned to Hoppegarten during the 1920s. It was abandoned in 1945 and 1946, and it moved to Cologne in 1947.

The Union-Rennen serves as a trial for the Deutsches Derby, and many horses have won both races. The first was Schwindler, a joint winner of the Derby in 1875. The most recent was Sea The Moon in 2014.

Records
Leading jockey (7 wins):
 Tom Busby – Roman (1874), Oroszvar (1878), Picklock (1879), Tartar (1883), Fenek (1886), Bulgar (1887), Impuls (1895)

Leading trainer (7 wins):
 George Arnull – Weissdorn (1925), Alba (1930), Aventin (1932), Sturmvogel (1935), Ad Astra (1940), Magnat (1941), Asterblüte (1949)
 (note: the trainers of some of the early winners are unknown)

Winners since 1970

Earlier winners

 1834: Alba
 1835: Remus
 1836: Donna Maria
 1837: Mozart
 1838: My Lady
 1839: Mandarin
 1840: Kipfelnose
 1841: Prince Regent
 1842: Banquo
 1843: Madeline
 1844: John Bull
 1845: Minotaurus
 1846: Dolores
 1847: Whatstone
 1848: Meridian
 1849: Achaja
 1850: Black Prince
 1851: Lionel
 1852: California
 1853: Uriel
 1854: Koh-i-Noor
 1855: Carabas
 1856: My Hope
 1857: Verzug
 1858: Pizarro
 1859: Collingwood
 1860: Emilius
 1861: Rookeby
 1862: Wildrose
 1863: Last Pippin
 1864: Pauline
 1865: Bellario
 1866: Adalbert
 1867: Pocahontas
 1868: Gorgo
 1869: Ignorant
 1870: Flibustier
 1871: Stachel
 1872: Sonntag
 1873: Hochstapler
 1874: Roman
 1875: Schwindler
 1876: Good Hope
 1877: Zützen
 1878: Oroszvar
 1879: Picklock
 1880: Mereny
 1881: Orient
 1882: Taurus
 1883: Tartar
 1884: Czimer
 1885: Italy
 1886: Fenek
 1887: Bulgar
 1888: Burgwart
 1889: Aba
 1890: Dalberg
 1891: Alnok
 1892: Dorn
 1893: Geier
 1894: Adonis
 1895: Impuls
 1896: Rondinelli
 1897: Destillateur
 1898: Vollmond
 1899: Gastfreund
 1900: Pomp
 1901: Nicus
 1902: Prinz Hamlet
 1903: Laurin
 1904: Pathos
 1905: Festino
 1906: Parmenio
 1907: Rojestwensky
 1908: Bajazzo
 1909: Swirtigal
 1910: Wandersmann
 1911: Mondstein
 1912: Matterhorn
 1913: Majestic
 1914: Ariel
 1915: Languard
 1916: Taucher
 1917: Landgraf
 1918: Orilus
 1919: Eckstein
 1920: Nubier
 1921: König Midas
 1922: Lentulus
 1923: Augias
 1924: Fundin
 1925: Weissdorn
 1926: Ferro
 1927: Torero
 1928: Lupus
 1929: Graf Isolani
 1930: Alba
 1931: Agathon
 1932: Aventin
 1933: Alchimist
 1934: Travertin
 1935: Sturmvogel
 1936: Periander
 1937: Blasius
 1938: Frauenpreis
 1939: Organdy
 1940: Ad Astra
 1941: Magnat
 1942: Effendi
 1943: Panzerturm
 1944: Poet
 1945–46: no race
 1947: Volkstanz
 1948: Angeber
 1949: Asterblüte
 1950: Niederländer
 1951: Neckar
 1952: Grenzbock
 1953: Liebesmahl
 1954: Blumenprinz
 1955: König Ottokar
 1956: Kilometer
 1957: Windfang
 1958: Grind
 1959: Wettcoup
 1960: Mohikaner
 1961: Baalim
 1962: Amboss
 1963: Gladstone
 1964: Marinus
 1965: Fioravanti
 1966: Ilix
 1967: Luciano
 1968: Literat
 1969: Akari

See also
 List of German flat horse races

References
 Racing Post:

 galopp-sieger.de – Union-Rennen.
 horseracingintfed.com – International Federation of Horseracing Authorities – Union-Rennen (2016).
 pedigreequery.com – Union-Rennen – Köln.

1834 establishments in Germany
Flat horse races for three-year-olds
Horse races in Germany
Recurring sporting events established in 1834
Sport in Cologne